is a Japanese manga series written and illustrated by Kujira Anan. It was first serialized in the supplementary edition of Kodansha's shōjo manga magazine Dessert, Pink, from May 2017 to October 2020, and then transferred to the main magazine in December 2020. A live-action film adaptation premiered in Japanese theatres in March 2023.

Media

Manga
Written and illustrated by Kujira Anan, And Yet, You Are So Sweet was first serialized in the Kodansha's supplementary edition of Dessert shōjo manga magazine, Pink, from May 24, 2017, to October 24, 2020. It was transferred to the main magazine on December 23, 2020. Kodansha has collected its chapters into individual tankōbon volumes. The first volume was released on January 12, 2018. As of January 13, 2023, eight volumes have been released.

In North America, the manga is licensed for English release by Kodansha USA.

Volume list

Live-action film
In August 2022, it was announced that the manga would receive a live-action film adaptation, which premiered on March 3, 2023. The film, directed by Takehiko Shinjō, with script by Haruka Ōkita, will star Mei Hata as Maaya Kisaragi and Kyōhei Takahashi of J-pop boy band Naniwa Danshi as Sui Chigira. The film will be distributed by Shochiku.

References

Further reading

External links
  
  
 

Kodansha manga
Manga adapted into films
Romance anime and manga
Shochiku films
Shōjo manga